Barry Zoeller is a former news anchor and news director of KERO-TV.  He was there from 1992 to 2000.  He also worked at WHO-TV in Des Moines, Iowa as a news anchor and at KODE-TV in Joplin, Missouri.  He is currently Vice President, Director of Corporate Communications at Tejon Ranch.  He's been there since August 2004.  Before joining Tejon Ranch, Zoeller was the executive director for the Kern County Board of Trade, which he held until 2000.
He was a losing contestant on the game show Joker's Wild in 1982.

Education
Zoeller obtained his degree with honors from Ozark Christian College in Missouri. He also studied at Loyola Marymount University and California State University Fullerton.

Movies
Zoeller was the original producer of the movie David, which aired on ABC Television. He also wrote, produced, and directed The Resurrection Trail and Temptation Control.

Organizations
He is on the board of directors of the Bakersfield Museum of Art Foundation and was previously a board member with the Greater Bakersfield Chamber of Commerce. Barry is also a Director on the board at Court Appointed Special Advocates of Kern County

References

American television news anchors
Living people
Ozark Christian College alumni
Year of birth missing (living people)